Crime in the Sun (Swedish: Brott i sol) is a 1947 Swedish crime drama film directed by Göran Gentele and starring Birger Malmsten,  Gunnel Broström and Margareta Fahlén. The film's sets were designed by the art director Nils Nilsson. Location shooting took place on the island of Värmdö.

Synopsis
Harry returns home after spending six years in a mental asylum. Gradually he recalls the events that lead one of his friends to commit murderer, and he now invites them back to the house in order to uncover which is the killer.

Cast
 Birger Malmsten as 	Harry
 Gunnel Broström as 	Marguerite
 Margareta Fahlén as Eva
 Ulf Palme as 	Rickard
 Curt Masreliez as 	Raoul
 Jan Molander as Georg
 Yngve Nordwall as Doktor Bergquist
 Wiktor Andersson as 	Trädgårdsmästaren
 Elsa Ebbesen as Stina
 Ernst Brunman as 	Customer in Furniture Shop 
 Agda Helin as 	Wife of Customer in Furniture Shop 
 Gull Natorp as 	Cleaning Lady

References

Bibliography 
 Qvist, Per Olov & von Bagh, Peter. Guide to the Cinema of Sweden and Finland. Greenwood Publishing Group, 2000.

External links 
 

1947 films
Swedish crime films
1947 crime films
1940s Swedish-language films
Films directed by Göran Gentele
Films shot in Stockholm
Films set in Stockholm
1940s Swedish films